Deborah (minor planet designation: 541 Deborah) is a minor planet orbiting the Sun. It was discovered by Max Wolf on August 4, 1904. The semi-major axis of the orbit lies just inside the 5/2 Kirkwood gap, located at 2.824 AU. It was named after the biblical character Deborah.

References

External links 
 
 

000541
Discoveries by Max Wolf
Named minor planets
000541
19040804